The Queen's Award for Enterprise: Innovation (Technology) (2003) was awarded on 21 April 2003, by Queen Elizabeth II.

Recipients
The following organisations were awarded this year.
ACIS of Loudwater, Buckinghamshire for GPS based real time information for passenger transport users and operators.
Activa Healthcare Ltd of Burton-upon-Trent, Staffordshire for Medical compression hosiery, bandages and training to prevent and treat venous disease.
Antenna Audio Ltd of London SE16 for Technology for the self-guided audio tour market.
Avecia Biotechnology of Blackley, Manchester for Large-scale production of DNA medicines.
BAE Systems, Inertial Systems Division of Plymouth, Devon for Micro-machined silicon gyro for use in inertial systems in commercial and defence applications.
Blease Medical Equipment Limited of Chesham, Buckinghamshire for Advanced anaesthetic ventilator for both paediatric and adult patients within the operating theatre.
Bristow Helicopters Ltd of Redhill, Surrey for Developments to the fleet of search and rescue helicopters.
Burall PlasTec Limited of Wisbech, Cambridgeshire for Glued polypropylene packaging.
Cognitive Drug Research Ltd of Reading, Berkshire for Specialist systems for assessing mental functioning in human clinical trials.
Controlled Therapeutics (Scotland) Ltd of East Kilbride, Glasgow, Scotland for Pharmaceutical hydrogel for childbirth.
Delcam plc of Birmingham for ‘ArtCAM’ software for designing intricately decorated products.
DuPont Teijin Films UK Limited of Wilton, Middlesbrough for Melinex@ Core 1 laminated polyester film card.
Dyson Ltd of Malmesbury, Wiltshire for Development of first dual cyclone bagless vacuum cleaner and continuous development of cyclone technology.
EMB Consultancy of Epsom, Surrey for Actuarial services, risk analysis and financial modelling.
Fairbanks Environmental Ltd of Skelmersdale, Lancashire for Wetstock management services.
Hainsworth Protective Fabrics, a trading division of A. W. Hainsworth and Sons Ltd of Pudsey, West Yorkshire for TI-technologyTM, innovative textile manufacturing system.
Huntleigh Healthcare Ltd, Diagnostic Products Division of Cardiff, Wales for Dopplex@ Assist range handheld electronic foetal monitor.
ID Business Solutions Limited t/a IDBS of Guildford, Surrey for The ActivityBase software suite for data management in drug discovery research.
IFS Global Logistics of Antrim, County Antrim, Northern Ireland for Vendorvillage.com - virtual warehousing system.
INEOS Silicas Ltd, Desiccants of Warrington, Cheshire for Sorbsil@ CHAMELEONTMC desiccant indicating silica gel.
Intelligent Security Ltd of Bordon, Hampshire for Video Smoke Detection (VSD). A camera based fire detection system.
Kodak Polychrome Graphics of Morley, Leeds for Electra Excel Thermal Printing Plate.
Stewart Linford Chairmaker Ltd of High Wycombe, Buckinghamshire for Making and selling high quality furniture, especially limited editions.
The London Clearing House Limited of London EC3 for LCH SwapClear, the global central counterparty clearing service for OTC-traded interbank interest rate swaps.
Marks and Spencer p.l.c. - Menswear Business Unit of London W1 for ‘Tailoring Machine Washable’ ultra easy care formal garments.
Architects Marks Barfield of London SW4 for The London Eye.
McCain Foods (GB) Ltd of Scarborough, North Yorkshire for McCain Home Fries Oven Chips.
mi2g Ltd of London SW11 for Bespoke Security ArchitectureTM.
Micropathology Ltd of Coventry, Warwickshire for Application of techniques for rapid diagnosis of organisms involved in infection.
Morgan Group Technology Ltd of Stourport-on-Severn, Worcestershire for Bio-soluble high temperature insulation products.
Oxford Instruments Superconductivity Limited of Abingdon, Oxfordshire for 900 MHz superconducting magnets for NMR applications in life science and drug discovery.
Paragon Labels Limited of Spalding, Lincolnshire for The production of tamper proof sleeve-look self-adhesive labels - ‘Wrap Around’.
PayPoint Ltd of Welwyn Garden City, Hertfordshire for Consumer retail payment services.
PerkinElmer (UK) Ltd, Optoelectronics Division of Wokingham, Berkshire for FD440/CHROMOS 11 portable dispersion tester.
Promethean Ltd of Blackburn, Lancashire for ACTIVboardPlus, a whole group teaching and learning system.
RFX Limited of Livingston, West Lothian, Scotland for Precision crystal oscillators.
STG Aerospace Ltd of Swaffham, Norfolk for SafTGlo photoluminescent emergency evacuation guidance system.
The Sporting Exchange Ltd t/a Betfair.com of London W6 for Betting exchange.
Structural Statics Limited of Winchester, Hampshire for Controlling risk by advanced structural monitoring.
Stylographics Ltd of Watford, Hertfordshire for Display and point-of-sale graphics to the retail, exhibition and museum sectors.
Thermal Ceramics UK Ltd of Bromborough, Wirral for Bio-soluble high temperature insulation products.
TRACERCO part of Johnson Matthey Plc of Billingham, Cleveland for TRACERCO ProfilerTM for the measurement and control of multi-phase separation vessels.
Transdek UK Ltd of Retford, Nottinghamshire for Hydraulically powered loading system for loading goods in vehicles.
Translift Engineering Limited of Redditch, Worcestershire for Forklift truck design.
Travel Counsellors Ltd of Bolton for Holiday booking from home via personal travel advisors.
Trendsetter Home Furnishings Ltd of Oldham for Duvet that can be washed in a domestic machine.
Tripos Receptor Research Ltd of Bude, Cornwall for Informatics driven discovery process to accelerate the finding of new drugs.
UWG Group Ltd of Norwich, Norfolk for Suspended Well Abandonment Tool (SWATTM).
Worthington-Richardson Designs of Saundersfoot, Pembrokeshire, Wales for Surgical gloves.
Zerpetz Ltd t/a Arrowvale Electronics of Redditch, Worcestershire for on-train monitoring recorder.
Zetechtics Ltd of Kirkbymoorside, North Yorkshire for Jupiter subsea control system for offshore oilfield intervention tasks.

References

Queen's Award for Enterprise: Innovation (Technology)
2003 in the United Kingdom